Warren Commercial Historic District may refer to:

Warren Commercial Historic District (Warren, Illinois), listed on the National Register of Historic Places in Jo Daviess County, Illinois
Warren Commercial Historic District (Warren, Ohio), listed on the National Register of Historic Places in Trumbull County, Ohio